Pulaski is a census-designated place in Williams County, in the U.S. state of Ohio.

History
Pulaski was originally called Lafayette. When it was discovered another Lafayette existed in the state, the name was changed to Pulaski in order to avoid repetition. A post office called Pulaski was established in 1837, and remained in operation until 1914. The present name honors Count Casimir Pulaski, an American Revolutionary War soldier.

References

Unincorporated communities in Williams County, Ohio
Unincorporated communities in Ohio